Nomani is a surname. Notable people with the surname include:

Abul Qasim Nomani, Indian Islamic scholar
Asra Nomani (born 1965), Indian-born American author
Habibur Rahman Nomani (1926–2005), Indian politician
Hamdullah Nomani, mayor of Kabul, Afghanistan
Maulana Habibur Rahman Nomani (1926–2005), Indian politician
Manzoor Nomani (1905–1997), Indian Islamic scholar
Mufti Abul Qasim Nomani (born 1947), Indian academic administrator
Muhammad ibn Ibrahim al-Nu'mani, 10th-century Shi'a scholar
Sajjad Nomani (born 1955), Indian Islamic scholar
Shibli Nomani (1857–1914), Indian scholar

See also
Numan (disambiguation)
Nu'man
Tafsir Numani, Shia Quranic exegesis
Nomani Tonga, Tongan rugby union player